= Pool equipment =

Pool equipment may refer to:

- Cue sports equipment, sporting goods used for playing pool (pocket billiards)
- Sanitation and other general equipment for swimming pools
- Water sports equipment used in swimming pools and natural bodies of water
